Progress M-1, was a Soviet uncrewed cargo spacecraft which was launched in 1989 to resupply the Mir space station. The eighteenth of sixty four Progress spacecraft to visit Mir, it was the first Progress-M spacecraft to be launched, and had the serial number 201. It carried supplies including food, water and oxygen for the Mir EO-5 crew aboard Mir, as well as equipment for conducting scientific research, and fuel for adjusting the station's orbit and performing manoeuvres. At the time of docking, Mir was uncrewed, and remained so until the arrival of the Mir EO-5 crew two weeks later.

Launch
Progress M-1 was launched at 03:09:32 UTC on 23 August 1989, atop a Soyuz-U2 carrier rocket flying from Site 1/5 at the Baikonur Cosmodrome. It docked with the forward port of Mir Core Module at 05:19:02 UTC on 25 August 1989. Progress M-1 remained docked with Mir for three months before undocking at 09:02:23 UTC on 1 December 1989 to make way for the Kvant-2 module.

Decay
Progress M-1 was deorbited at 10:32:00 UTC, a few hours after it had undocked. It burned up in the atmosphere over the Pacific Ocean, with remaining debris landing in the ocean at around 11:21 UTC.

See also

 1989 in spaceflight
 List of Progress flights
 List of uncrewed spaceflights to Mir

References

1989 in the Soviet Union
Progress (spacecraft) missions
Spacecraft launched in 1989